Pyatkovo is a rural locality (a village) in Matigorskoye Rural Settlement of Kholmogorsky District, Arkhangelsk Oblast, Russia. The population was 25 as of 2010. There are 3 streets.

Geography 
Pyatkovo is located on the Severnaya Dvina River, 39 km south of Kholmogory (the district's administrative centre) by road. Kopachyovo is the nearest rural locality.

References 

Rural localities in Kholmogorsky District